Our Motorsports is an American professional stock car racing team that competes full-time in the NASCAR Xfinity Series, fielding the No. 02 Chevrolet Camaro SS full-time for David Starr and Kyle Weatherman and the No. 23 part-time for TBA. The team also previously competed part-time in the ARCA Menards Series, fielding the No. 02 and No. 09 teams. They have also competed in the NASCAR Whelen Modified Tour. The team is also one of the youngest owned teams in NASCAR being co-owned by 19-year-old Mary Our and only the 2nd female-owned team in NASCAR.

History
The team fielded the No. 22 full-time for Tommy Barrett Jr. in the NASCAR Whelen Modified Tour in 2014. The following year, they attempted to make their debut in the ARCA Racing Series at Daytona with Barrett Jr. driving the No. 7 car, but he did not end up qualifying for the race. It was the only ARCA race the team attempted that year.

In 2016, they returned to ARCA at Talladega with the No. 02 Chevrolet driven by defending NASCAR Whelen Southern Modified Tour champion Andy Seuss. The team had a great qualifying run, starting 10th, but encountered a failure in the brake system and finished 31st. They did not run any other races until Daytona in 2017, where Seuss returned to drive the No. 02 and finished 20th. They returned to Talladega a few months later and impressively, Seuss came from a 33rd-place starting position to finish 2nd in the race. They then attempted the race at Chicagoland in September, the team's first-ever non-restrictor plate start in ARCA.

For 2018, Seuss and Our attempted Daytona and Talladega again along with the new ARCA race at Charlotte. The team fielded a second car for the first time at Talladega that year, which was the No. 6 for Josh Williams.

The team fielded two cars again at Daytona in 2019, with Seuss back in the No. 02 and C. J. McLaughlin in the No. 09. McLaughlin landed the ride after driving for the team at ARCA's Daytona testing in January. Both drivers would run a few races each in their respective cars throughout the season, with Seuss and the No. 02 team racing at Talladega and Charlotte like they did in 2018, and McLaughlin and the No. 09 team running those same three races along with Pocono and Michigan in June.

On October 30, 2019, Our Motorsports announced at the NASCAR Hall of Fame that they would be fielding a full-time team in the NASCAR Xfinity Series, the No. 02 Chevrolet, with Seuss sharing the ride with multiple other drivers that were not announced at that time. Brett Moffitt joined the team for originally a four-race schedule on January 30, 2020. The team purchased cars and equipment from GMS Racing, which closed down their Xfinity team after the 2019 season. The team would also continue to compete in ARCA part-time in 2020, though they only did the race at Daytona with Seuss in the No. 02 and Benny Chastain in the No. 09. and Our Motorsports ARCA team would cease operations after Daytona.

On March 3, 2022, it was announced that Good Money Motorsports, led by Arlis “Vic” Reynolds, who owns Larry's Hard Lemonade Brewing Co., and Jack Perone Fulton, who is the Founder and CEO of International Championship Boxing LLC, had invested in the company, giving them partial ownership. Larry's Hard Lemonade Brewing Co. will also sponsor the team in select races.

Xfinity Series

Car No. 02 history

Multiple Drivers (2020-Present)

In 2020, Brett Moffitt would run 4 races for the team with Andy Seuss and others running a few races. This would later change as Andy Seuss parted ways with Our, as Moffitt did so well in the 02 that he nearly ran the full season, with only missing a few races, which were run by Patrick Emerling, Jairo Avila Jr., and Andy Lally.

In 2021, Moffitt would run the full season again except for 2 races due to health issues, with Ty Dillon driving.

In 2022, Moffitt would return full-time, but after the Pennzoil 150 those plans changed and it was announced the he and the team had agreed to part ways. Blaine Perkins was chosen as Moffitt's replacement.

Car No. 02 results

Car No. 03 history
Tyler Reddick & Andy Lally (2021)
In 2021, Tyler Reddick attempted to qualify this car at Daytona, but failed to qualify due to qualifying being rained out. Later starts came with Andy Lally, but failed to qualify since the car was outside the top 40 in owners points and a lack of qualifying and wouldn't appear on the entry list following Dover. The 03 hasn't attempted a race since.

Car No. 03 results

Car No. 23 history

Multiple Drivers (2021)

In 2021, owner points were from RSS Racing and Reaume Brothers Racing's No. 23, with Tyler Reddick, Blaine Perkins, Natalie Decker, J. J. Yeley, Andy Lally, Ty Dillon, Patrick Emerling, and Austin Dillon split the seat time.

Anthony Alfredo (2022)
For 2022, Anthony Alfredo would drive the 23 car full-time while its owners points were bought by Emerling-Gase Motorsports

Car No. 23 results

Car No. 27 history
Jeb Burton (2022)
In 2022, Jeb Burton drove the No. 27 car full-time. On October 28, he announced he would be leaving Our Motorsports at the end of the 2022 season.

Car No. 27 results

References

External links
 
Official website

NASCAR teams
ARCA Menards Series teams